Phyllobothriidea is an order of flatworms belonging to the class Cestoda.

Taxonomy

Families:
 Chimaerocestidae
 Phyllobothriidae

Genera:
 Alexandercestus Ruhnke & Workman, 2013
 Bibursibothrium McKenzie & Caira, 1998
 Bilocularia Obersteiner, 1914
 Calyptrobothrium Monticelli, 1893
 Cardiobothrium McKenzie & Caira, 1998
 Chimaerocestos Williams & Bray, 1984
 Clistobothrium Dailey & Vogelbein, 1990
 Crossobothrium Linton, 1889
 Flexibothrium McKenzie & Caira, 1998
 Guidus Ivanov, 2006
 Hemipristicola Cutmore, Theiss, Bennett & Cribb, 2011
 Monorygma Diesing, 1863
 Orygmatobothrium Diesing, 1863
 Pelichnibothrium Monticelli, 1889
 Phyllobothrium Van Beneden, 1850
 Rockacestus gen. nov. - Parasitises skates
 Ruhnkebothrium gen. nov. - Parasitises hammerhead sharks
 Scyphophyllidium Woodland, 1927
 Trilocularia Olsson, 1867
 Thysanocephalum Linton, 1890
 Yamaguticestus gen. nov. - Parasitises small squaliform sharks and catsharks

References

Cestoda